Loddin is a municipality on Usedom Island, in the Vorpommern-Greifswald district, in Mecklenburg-Vorpommern, Germany.

A small coastal bathing resort, Loddin lies on an isthmus on the island of Usedom on the Baltic Sea. It is located within the Usedom Nature Park and is one of the four so-called Amber Spas on the island, connected by a 12 km long fine sandy beach called Amber Beach. The other three amber spas are Koserow, Ückeritz and Zempin.

Loddin has some vineyards at the Baltic Sea.

As of 2015, Loddin had a population of 969.

The place can be reached by federal highway B111 and has a station on the Usedom island railway.

References

External links

Official website of Seebad Loddin (German)

Seaside resorts in Germany
Populated coastal places in Germany (Baltic Sea)
Vorpommern-Greifswald